Braddish Billings (September 23, 1783 – April 8, 1864) was an early settler in the Ottawa area, for whom the community of Billings Bridge was named. 

He was born in Ware, Massachusetts in 1783, but moved to the Brockville area with his family when he was 9. He later worked cutting down white pine trees along the Ottawa River and transporting the logs down river. He also served on the Bytown Mechanics' Institute executive.

In 1812, Billings moved to the Ottawa area and settled on a farm south of the Rideau River in what was then the Township of Gloucester. In 1830, a bridge was built over the Rideau River near the Billings Farm to make it easier to transport produce into town.

Family
He married Lamira Dow of Merrickville in 1813. The couple had nine children: Sabra, Cynthia, Lamira, Braddish II, Elkanah, Samuel, Sarah (Sally), Charles, Hiram, two of whom died: Cynthia and Hiram.

The couple's oldest son, Major Bradish Billings II (1847–1891), a pupil of architect Henry A. Sims in Philadelphia from 1863–1866, opened an architecture office in Ottawa in 1870 and later worked as a public servant with the Interior Department 1872-1885. Bradish Billings Jr. served in the North West Rebellion of 1885 and was promoted to Major in 1892. W. Ross Billings also became an architect in the Ottawa area. Elkanah Billings became a naturalist and Canada's first paleontologist.

Legacy
Billings died in 1864 and is buried on the Billings Estate which has been preserved as a historical site and museum. The Billings House, on the site, was built in 1829. The area where Billings had his farm and the nearby bridge over the river are now known as Billings Bridge. 

The site tells the story of the five generations of Billings family members who lived on the site before the municipality assumed ownership. The museum runs numerous programs for families throughout the year and operates a tea service on the lawn in the back gardens from May through August.

References

External links 

Billings Estate Museum

1783 births
1864 deaths
People from Ware, Massachusetts
American emigrants to pre-Confederation Ontario
People from Brockville
Settlers of the National Capital Region (Canada)
Immigrants to Upper Canada